Tyras Vallis is an ancient river valley in the Lunae Palus quadrangle of Mars.  It is located at 8.4 N° and 50.2° W.  It was named after a classical name for the present Dniester River (in Ukraine).

References 

Lunae Palus quadrangle
Valleys and canyons on Mars